The World of Skin was a music project springing out of the American group Swans, which was a collaboration between the core Swans members Michael Gira and Jarboe. The project was initially called Skin, with the first two albums being released under that name, the last one being released under the name the World of Skin. In the UK, the first two albums were released by Product Inc., an imprint of Mute Records, while the last was released on Gira's own Young God label.

History 
Swans' album Greed began a trend toward greater use of melody, and this trend continued with the later Children of God. The work performed as Skin was initially in marked contrast with the less overtly melodic but contemporaneous Swans work, but later Swans work integrated the two aspects.

Blood, Women, Roses (1987) was the project's first release and featured vocals entirely by Jarboe, who had previously mainly been performing backing vocals. Many of the tracks on this album were covers of show tunes and other popular songs (for example "Cry Me a River" and "The Man I Love").  Many of the tracks still featured the monumental use of percussion that was common in earlier Swans work, but combined this with a greater use of melody ("Red Rose" is typical of this).

Blood, Women, Roses was followed in 1988 by Shame, Humility, Revenge, which featured vocals by Michael Gira (although Jarboe did perform some backing vocals). The first two albums were released only in Europe, but most of the albums’ tracks were combined in the US release World of Skin (released under the band name World of Skin), which was followed by the final World of Skin release, Ten Songs for Another World.  This album featured vocals from both performers, including a cover of Nick Drake's "Black-Eyed Dog" that was performed by Jarboe.

Group members
 Michael Gira - vocals, guitar, keyboards, samples, sounds (1987-1990)
 Jarboe - vocals, keyboards, sounds (1987-1990)
 Norman Westberg - guitar (1988)
 Harry Crosby - bass (1988)

Discography

Studio releases
 Blood, Women, Roses (1987)
 Shame, Humility, Revenge (1988)
 Ten Songs for Another World (1990)

Compilations
 The World of Skin (1988)

Singles
 Girl, Come Out 12" (1987)
 One Thousand Years  12" (1987)

External links
www.swans.pair.com
www.younggodrecords.com

Musical groups established in 1987
Musical groups disestablished in 1990
American experimental musical groups
Swans (band)
Mute Records artists